Régis Fernandes Silva (born September 22, 1976 in São Paulo), better known as Régis Pitbull or simply Régis, is a former Brazilian footballer who played as a forward.

Club statistics

Personal life
Régis has battled drug addiction. In April 2021, he was admitted to a rehabilitation clinic.

References

External links

1976 births
Brazilian footballers
Brazilian expatriate footballers
Association football forwards
Living people
Ceará Sporting Club players
C.S. Marítimo players
Kyoto Sanga FC players
Associação Atlética Ponte Preta players
CR Vasco da Gama players
Daejeon Hana Citizen FC players
K League 1 players
ABC Futebol Clube players
Sport Club Corinthians Paulista players
Associação Portuguesa de Desportos players
Esporte Clube Bahia players
Expatriate footballers in South Korea
Expatriate footballers in Japan
J1 League players
Expatriate footballers in Turkey
Brazilian expatriate sportspeople in South Korea
São Raimundo Esporte Clube footballers
Footballers from São Paulo